Karin Majtánová (born 1 March 1974) is a Slovak television presenter, model and actress. She won the Miss Slovakia beauty pageant in 1993. She has presented television programmes on Slovenská televízia among other stations.

References

External links

1974 births
Living people
People from Trenčín
Slovak television presenters
Slovak female models
Miss International 1993 delegates
Miss World 1994 delegates
Slovak beauty pageant winners
Slovak women television presenters